Matthaios is a Greek given name. Notable people with the name include:

 Matthaios Kamariotis (died 1490), Greek scholar of the Renaissance era
 Matthaios Kofidis (1855–1921), Greek businessman and member of the Ottoman parliament
 Matthaios Paranikas (1832-1914), Greek scholar
 Matthaios Tsahouridis (born 1978), Greek composer and musician of stringed instruments

See also
 Matthew (name)

Greek masculine given names